Events from the year 1957 in Jordan.

Incumbents
Monarch: Hussein 
Prime Minister: 
 until 13 April: Suleiman Nabulsi
 15 April-24 April: Husayin al-Khalidi 
 starting 24 April: Ibrahim Hashem

Events

 April 13- Failed coup d'état.

See also

 Years in Iraq
 Years in Syria
 Years in Saudi Arabia

References

 
1950s in Jordan
Jordan
Jordan
Years of the 20th century in Jordan